S2 (ex-Prozorlivy and ex-Gagara in Russian service) was a Finnish Sokol class torpedo boat that had been seized from the Russians after the Finnish Civil War 1918. She sank during a fierce storm on 4 October 1925, taking with her the whole crew of 53.

Background

Between 1900 and 1908, the Russians built 25 Sokol class torpedo boats for the Russian Baltic Fleet. "Sokol" (Сокол) is Russian for Falcon). The fourth ship of the class, Gagara (Гагара, Russian for Loon), was built at the Neva shipyard in Saint Petersburg and carried the construction number 102.

On 9 March 1902 the ship was renamed Prozorlivy (Прозорливый, Russian for sharp or awake). She was used as a trawler in 1911, but when World War I ignited she was taken into service as a minesweeper and was based in a Finnish port.

The war was going badly for the Russians and the Russian Navy revolted. The revolts soon spread out in the nation and Finland managed to secure its independence from Russia in the turmoil. However, tensions were still running high and soon after the declaration of independence the Finnish Civil War erupted. The socialists (reds) and the non-socialists (whites) clashed. Elements of the Russian Baltic fleet were still moored in Finnish harbours and the Russian sailors were sympathetic with the socialist side. However, the Finnish reds faced tough pressure from the whites, who had better military leadership. A German force that landed in southern Finland – in the back of the reds – finally broke the reds''' fighting spirit.

The Russian fleet in Helsinki panicked when the Germans marched against Helsinki. They managed to secure a deal with the Germans, which allowed them to withdraw to Russia. However, only the largest ships managed to return to Russia, due to the harsh ice conditions of the Gulf of Finland. Numerous vessels were left behind to be seized by the whites and the German troops. On April 13, Prozorlivy was conquered by the whites and she was transferred to the Finnish navy, along with her five sister ships (Ryany (later S1), Poslishny (S3), Rezvy (S4), Podvizhny (S5) and No 212 (S6)).Prozorlivy served over seven years in the Finnish navy. During her first years, she supported British operations against the Bolshevik navy. In accordance with the Treaty of Tartu of 1920, three of the Sokol class ships were returned to the Soviet Union in 1922. It was also planned that Prozorlivy would have been handed over, but the ageing ship was sold to Finland, where she was included in the Finnish navy. Prozorlivy was renamed S2 in 1922 and she continued to serve the fleet until 4 October 1925, when she was lost at sea with all hands. The loss of S2 is the worst peacetime accident in the Finnish navy and it shocked both the navy and the country. The disaster was a major catalyst for a large renewal program of the Finnish fleet.

The last journey of the torpedo boat S2
One of the Finnish Navy's annual traditions was a naval visit to the Finnish coastal towns along the Gulf of Bothnia, the trip doubling as a training exercise for conscript sailors. In 1925, the gunboats Klas Horn and Hämeenmaa, as well as the torpedo boats S1 and S2, embarked on one such journey. The plan was to visit all the coastal cities up to Tornio and the group began the journey from Uusikaupunki to Vaasa on 3 October 1925. They traveled in line formation with one kabellängd (1/10 nautical mile) internal distance and at a speed of 12 knots. S2 was positioned furthest back in the formation.

Initially everything went as planned, but as the journey progressed, the wind started to pick up and later developed into a fierce storm, which created difficulties for the ships. The crews had to increase the internal distance between the ships, and they were also forced to reduce speed.

The storm finally dispersed the formation when they reached the Pori parallel. Klas Horn, which was the lead ship of the formation, turned against the wind and headed towards the Swedish coast, followed by Hämeenmaa. The torpedo boats tried to follow the bigger vessels but were lagging behind due to the high waves. In the middle of the night, the wind speed reached hurricane force 48–55 m/s (12 on the Beaufort scale).

The stormy sea created big problems for the torpedo boats when their propellers were lifted too close to the surface. This reduced their efficiency and what worsened the situation was the fact that the S2's bearings were worn out, which caused a lot of vibrations in the ship and threatened to open up a leak where the shaft went through the hull. Both of the torpedo boats began taking in water in the high seas. This was mainly due to the construction of the superstructure. The coal was also slowly running out since the crew had to feed more into the boilers than usual due to the high seas. The flotilla leader Klas Horn sent out a distress call on behalf of the torpedo boats. The rescue ship Protector, which was located in Vaasa, received the distress call through the Finnish headquarters in Helsinki, and the message was also received by the Swedish rescue vessel Helios. Both promised that they would come to the rescue.

The ships of the formation were soon given orders to go on their own to the closest available harbor. The gun boat Klas Horn headed for the Swedish coast, the gun boat Hämeenmaa headed for Vaasa and the torpedo boat S1 barely made it to Mäntyluoto outside Pori. She had only a few pieces of coal left when arriving there. S2 also tried to go to Pori, but the engines and the pumps could not function fully and the leaking worsened. It also seemed like rescue was too far away. Land was in sight and the radio operator of S2 was in contact with the radio station in Vaasa almost until the moment of disaster. The last message from the ship arrived at 1.23 pm, barely two minutes before she sank. The answer from the radio operator on S2 on the call from Vaasa was short: "I can not work now".

The accident

The pilot station at Reposaari observed the struggle of the ship in the waters between Outoori and the Säppi Lighthouse. The high waves made the ship roll violently until a breaker rolled over the ship. The pilot station saw the ship for a short while (when it probably had rolled over) but it disappeared from view at 1.25 pm. Later the pilots learned that it had been the torpedo boat S2 that they had observed. The torpedo boat's crew of 53 were lost in the disaster.

The loss of S2 was a great shock to the nation and to the young navy. An intense debate about the underlying reasons followed. An investigation panel was appointed to find the reasons for the disaster. At the place of the sinking, the sea bed rises sharply, and creates sharp breakers, especially when the wind is coming from west or northwest. This was later considered to be the main cause of the disaster. Further, the seagoing qualities had not fully been researched in the old Russian ships. There were, for example, no stabilization tables or ballast calculations for the type.

The investigation also found that the crew had not obtained updated weather data, although such were available. The investigators especially criticized the leadership of the commander of the formation, Yrjö Roos. Roos had a reputation of being very stubborn, he probably tried to get all the ships to Vaasa, where they were expected the following day. The order to leave the formation was given very late, and when given, it was very unclear. All the different ships' captains interpreted it in different ways. In the publics' opinion, Roos was to be the scapegoat for the loss of S2.

One year later, Commander Roos was on a routine trip with one of the navy's A-boats to Örö. Upon arrival, Roos was found dead in his cabin. The investigation revealed that he had died from carbon monoxide poisoning from a faulty exhaust pipe. This incident came however to spark different conspiracy theories.

The salvaging of the vessel
The ship was found in June 1926 and the Ministry of Defence immediately began planning a salvage operation. S2 was lying upside down at a depth of only 15 meters (50 feet) and it was believed that the lifting operation would not be too difficult. The salvagers first tried to lift the ship by pumping air into the hull. This lifted the fore section to the surface, but the aft section was securely stuck in the bottom mud. They tried to loosen it by aiming high-pressure streams of water against the mud, but to no avail.

The Ministry of Defence soon ran out of money for the operation and gave the job to a private company. They too pumped air into the hull to lift it and pulled wires under the ship to lift it. After ten days, on 5 August 1926, the ship surfaced and floated with the aid of pontoons.

The vessel was transported to the Reposaari harbor in Pori, where it was turned on its keel, emptied on water and initially investigated. They found the bodies of 23 crew members inside the hull and these were taken ashore. S2 was then transported to Helsinki where a more thorough investigation was conducted. The ship was scrapped after the investigation.

The influence of the disaster
The loss of S2 created big headlines at its time and it upset both the general population, the personnel of the Finnish navy, as well as Finnish sailors. The accident and the following debate led to the creation of the Finnish Navy Association in 1926 (the organization is called the Finnish Maritime Society today). This organization ran the fleet renewal question and it had a great influence on the decision on the new Fleet Law that was established in 1927. This law resulted in the requisition of the coastal armoured ships Väinämöinen and Ilmarinen, the submarine fleet and the purchase of new torpedo boats in the 1930s.

The 23 bodies that were found inside the ship were buried at the Reposaari burial ground in a joint grave, on 15 August 1926. A statue over the dead sailors was raised at the Reposaari church one year later. The statue was made by the sculptor Wäinö Aaltonen.

The day of the disaster is also remembered by the Finnish navy every year.

Ships of the class in the Finnish navy

References

Sources

  Torpedbåten S2:s minne.'' Årsbok för Finlands flotta 2. Schildts 1925.
  Torpedovene S2:n tuho 4.10.1925
  The Finnish war veterans association's magazine, 5/2005, p 20.
  Finnish page about wrecks.

S-class torpedo boats
1899 ships
Shipwrecks in the Baltic Sea
Maritime incidents in 1925
Ships lost with all hands